Aralia wangshanensis is a species of plant in the family Araliaceae. It is endemic to China.

Taxonomy
The species was first described by Hermann Harms in 1896 as Pentapanax henryi. When it was transferred to the genus Aralia the name "Aralia henryi" was already in use for a different species so a replacement name was needed. The first legitimate name published in Aralia was Aralia wangshanensis, published by Yun Fei Deng in 2019, based on Pentapanax henryi var. wangshanensis, first published by Wan Chung Cheng in 1934.

References

wangshanensis
Flora of China
Conservation dependent plants
Plants described in 1896
Taxonomy articles created by Polbot